Andrew "Andy" Goodman (November 23, 1943June 21, 1964) was an American civil rights activist. He was one of three Congress of Racial Equality (CORE) workers murdered in Philadelphia, Mississippi by members of the Ku Klux Klan in 1964. Goodman and two fellow activists, James Chaney and Michael Schwerner, were volunteers for the Freedom Summer campaign that sought to register African-Americans to vote in Mississippi.

Early life and beginnings of activism
Andrew Goodman was born on November 23, 1943 in New York City, the second of three boys born to Robert, a writer and civil engineer, and Carolyn Goodman a psychologist and social activist. He grew up in the city's Upper East Side. Goodman was Jewish, like fellow civil rights activist Michael Schwerner, alongside whom Goodman would later be murdered. Goodman's neighborhood was a racially-mixed community of white, black, and Hispanic families.

The Goodman family and community were steeped in intellectual and socially progressive activism and were devoted to social justice. His mother Carolyn was a lifelong labor activist. In her youth, she helped farm workers to organize and was active in community efforts to support the Republican faction during the Spanish Civil War in the 1930s.

Andrew followed his parents' activist bent from a young age. At the age of 14, Goodman traveled to Washington, D.C. to participate in the 1958 Youth March for Integrated Schools. During the march, approximately 10,000 high school age students promoted the desegregation of American public schools after the U.S. Supreme Court's Brown v. Board of Education landmark decision in 1964 struck down the constitutionality of racial segregation in public schools. The next year, Goodman and a friend went to West Virginia to live in a coal mining town and sought to advocate to the governor over the poor working conditions there. At 17, Goodman traveled to Western Europe to understand the impact of largescale agribusiness on small farmers. Goodman also participated in a 1960 protest at a New York Woolworth's.

In 1961, Goodman graduated high school from the progressive Walden School, where he had attended from the age of 3. At Walden, he was involved in the theater program. He also arranged for Brooklyn Dodger Jackie Robinson, a neighbor of his and the first African-American to play in Major League Baseball, to speak at the school. After Walden, Goodman enrolled the Honors Program at the University of Wisconsin–Madison and considered a drama major, but withdrew after one semester after falling ill with pneumonia. He returned to New York City to improve his health and was selected for a role in the Off-Broadway play The Chief Thing by Russian dramatist Nikolaí Evreninov.

Goodman then enrolled at Queens College, New York City and majored in anthropology. At Queens, he was a friend and classmate of Paul Simon. He developed an interest in poetry. One of his poems, "A Corollary to a Poem by A. E. Housman," was posthumously discovered by his college professor Mary Doyle Curran and published in the Massachusetts Review and the New York Times. With Goodman's brief acting experience, he originally planned to study drama but switched to anthropology. Goodman's growing interest in anthropology seemed to parallel his increasing political seriousness. Throughout college, Goodman acted with an Off-Broadway repertory company.

Participation in Freedom Summer
In the spring of 1964, his junior year at Queens College, Goodman attended a talk by Mississippi civil rights activists Aaron Henry, head of the state's NAACP branch, and Fannie Lou Hamer, a prominent civil rights activist in Mississippi. Henry and Hammer were recruiting students under the age of 21, who with the permission of their parents, to participate in the Freedom Summer project to help register African-Americans to vote in Mississippi.

In 1964, Goodman, recruited by John Lewis, volunteered along with fellow activists Michael Schwerner, his wife Rita Schwerner Bender, and James Chaney to work on the "Freedom Summer" project of the Congress of Racial Equality (CORE) to register black people to vote in Mississippi. Having protested U.S. President Lyndon Johnson's presence at the opening of that year's World's Fair, Goodman left New York to train and develop civil rights strategies at Western College for Women (now part of Miami University) in Oxford, Ohio. In mid-June, Goodman joined Schwerner in Meridian, Mississippi, where the latter was designated head of the field office. They worked in rural areas on registering blacks to vote.

The Mississippi State Sovereignty Commission was strongly opposed to integration and civil rights. It paid spies to identify citizens suspected of activism, especially people from the North and West who entered the state. The records opened by court order in 1998 also revealed the state's deep complicity in the murders of Chaney, Goodman, and Schwerner, because its investigator A. L. Hopkins passed on to the Commission information about the workers, including the car license number of a new civil rights worker. Records showed the Commission, in turn, passed the information on to the Neshoba County Sheriff, who was implicated in the murders.

Schwerner had been working closely with an assistant James Chaney, also a civil rights activist in Meridian. On the morning of June 21, 1964, the three men set out for Philadelphia, Neshoba County, where they were to investigate the recent burning of Mount Zion Methodist Church, a black church that had agreed to be a site for a religious school for education and voter registration.

Arrest, release and murder

On their return to Meridian, the three men were stopped and arrested by Deputy Sheriff Cecil Price (a Klan member) for allegedly driving 35 miles over the 30-mile-per-hour speed limit. The trio were taken to the jail in Neshoba County where Chaney was booked for speeding, while Schwerner and Goodman were booked "for investigation".  After Chaney was fined $20, the three men were released and told to leave the county. Price followed them in his patrol car. At 10:25, Price sped to catch up with the station wagon before it crossed the border into the relative safety of Lauderdale County. Price ordered the three out of their car and into his. He drove them to a deserted area on Rock Cut Road while followed by two cars filled with other Klansmen. Price turned the trio over to the Klansmen who, after beating Chaney, shot and killed Schwerner, Goodman, and Chaney. An autopsy of Goodman, showing fragments of red clay in his lungs and grasped in his fists, suggests he was probably buried alive alongside the already dead Chaney and Schwerner.

Investigation and trial
The murders changed the course of the Civil Rights Movement:

Willie Blue, a surviving participant in the Freedom Summer movement said: “Goodman's richer than whipped cream. He wasn't supposed to die in Vietnam; he sure wasn’t supposed to die in Mississippi. When America’s brightest are murdered for doing something fundamentally American, suddenly the world knows about Mississippi. It was another nail in the segregated coffin." The FBI entered the case after the men disappeared. They helped find them buried in an earthen dam. The US government prosecuted the case under the Enforcement Act of 1870. The Neshoba County deputy sheriff and six conspirators were convicted by Federal prosecutors of civil rights violations but were not convicted of murder. Two defendants were acquitted because the jury deadlocked.

Reinvestigation

Journalist Jerry Mitchell, an award-winning investigative reporter for the Jackson Clarion-Ledger, had written extensively about the case for many years. Mitchell, who had already earned fame for helping secure convictions in several other high-profile civil rights era murder cases, including the assassination of Medgar Evers in Jackson, Mississippi, the Birmingham, Alabama 16th Street Baptist Church bombing, and the murder of Vernon Dahmer in Mississippi, developed new evidence, found new witnesses and pressured the state to take action. Barry Bradford, an Illinois high-school teacher later famous for helping clear the name of civil rights martyr Clyde Kennard, and three students, Allison Nichols, Sarah Siegel, and Brittany Saltiel, joined Mitchell's efforts.

Bradford and his students' documentary, produced for the National History Day contest, presented important new evidence and compelling reasons for reopening the Goodman, Chaney, and Schwerner case. They also obtained an interview with Edgar Ray Killen, which helped persuade the state to open the case for investigation. Mitchell was able to determine the identity of "Mr. X", the mystery informer who had helped the FBI discover the bodies and smash the conspiracy of the Klan in 1964, in part using evidence developed by Bradford and the students.

On January 7, 2005, Edgar Ray Killen was arrested. He was found guilty of three counts of manslaughternot murderon June 21, 2005, exactly 41 years to the day after the murders. He was sentenced to sixty years in prison—twenty years for each count, to be served consecutively.  He appealed the verdict, but the sentence was upheld on April 12, 2007, by the Supreme Court of Mississippi.[3] He died in prison on January 11, 2018, six days before his 93rd birthday.

On June 20, 2016, just one day ahead of the 52nd anniversary of the murders, Attorney General Hood announced an end to the federal and state investigations into the 'Mississippi Murders', officially closing the case.

Legacy and honors

In 1966, Andrew's parents, Robert and Carolyn Goodman started The Andrew Goodman Foundation to carry on the spirit and purpose of their son's life. After the death of Robert Goodman in 1969, Carolyn continued the work of thefFoundation, focusing on projects like a reverse march to Mississippi and a 25th Anniversary Memorial. The memorial, which took place at St. John The Divine Church in NYC, was attended by 10,000 people and was presided by Governor Mario Cuomo, Maya Angelou, Pete Seeger, Aaron Henry, Harry Belafonte, Robert Kennedy Jr., and others closely associated with the Civil Rights Movement. After Carolyn's death in August 2007, David Goodman, Andrew's younger brother, and Sylvia Golbin Goodman, David's wife, took up the work of the Foundation.

For nearly 50 years, the organization was a private foundation acting in the public interest. With their eyes set on the future, the Board of Trustees of The Andrew Goodman Foundation elected to turn the organization into a public charity in 2012. In 2014, on the fiftieth anniversary of the murders, the Foundation officially launched Vote Everywhere , a program designed to support college students who are continuing the work of Freedom Summer.

Goodman
 In 2002, a 2,176-foot peak in the Adirondack Mountains town of Tupper Lake, New York, was officially named Goodman Mountain in Goodman's memory. Goodman's family had spent summers there for 30 years.
 The Walden School, in Manhattan, named its middle and upper school building in Goodman's memory. The Trevor Day School now occupies the building and has maintained the building's name as the "Andrew Goodman Building".
 Goodman, along with Chaney and Schwerner, received a posthumous Presidential Medal of Freedom from President Barack Obama in 2014.
 The Chaney-Goodman-Schwerner Clock Tower of Rosenthal Library, is named in honor of James, Andrew, and Mickey on the CUNY Queens College Campus in New York City.
 The song "He Was My Brother", released in 1964 by Simon & Garfunkel, is a dedication to Goodman along with two others Civil Rights activists.

Cultural references

See also

References

Further reading
My Mantelpiece: A Memoir of Survival and Social Justice by Carolyn Goodman with Brad Herzog, Why Not Books, . Memoir by Andrew Goodman's mother.

External links
 “Long, Hot Summer '64; Episode 9,” 1964-08-06, WGBH, American Archive of Public Broadcasting (GBH and the Library of Congress), Boston, MA and Washington, DC, accessed June 7, 2021.
 The movement that helped reopen the case
 The Andrew Goodman Foundation
 Biography of Andrew Goodman
  An interview with Dr. Carolyn Goodman, 89, mother of Andrew Goodman (September 2005)
 The gravestone of Andrew Goodman at the Mount Judah Cemetery, Queens, NY

1943 births
1964 deaths
1964 murders in the United States
University of Wisconsin–Madison alumni
Murdered American Jews
Activists for African-American civil rights
Queens College, City University of New York alumni
Ku Klux Klan crimes in Mississippi
Assassinated American civil rights activists
People murdered in Mississippi
Male murder victims
Deaths by firearm in Mississippi
Presidential Medal of Freedom recipients
Activists from New York City
American murder victims
Civil rights movement
20th-century American people
People from the Upper West Side
Walden School (New York City) alumni